Ivan Viktorovich Khomukha (born 14 July 1994) is a Russian football player who plays for FC Volgar Astrakhan.

Club career
He made his debut in the Russian Professional Football League for FC Spartak-2 Moscow on 16 July 2013 in a game against FC Dynamo Bryansk. He made his Russian Football National League debut for Spartak-2 on 11 July 2016 in a game against FC Sibir Novosibirsk.

Khomukha joined FNL side FC Rotor Volgograd for the 2019–20 season, but after making just 16 appearances the club cancelled the defender's contract in December 2019.

References

External links

1994 births
People from Ipatovsky District
Sportspeople from Stavropol Krai
Living people
Russian footballers
Russia youth international footballers
Association football defenders
FC Spartak Moscow players
FC Spartak-2 Moscow players
FC SKA-Khabarovsk players
FC Rotor Volgograd players
FC Yenisey Krasnoyarsk players
FC Volgar Astrakhan players
FC Chayka Peschanokopskoye players
FC KAMAZ Naberezhnye Chelny players
FC Urozhay Krasnodar players
Russian First League players
Russian Second League players